or , also known as , is a Japanese sword school founded by  in the 17th century. Abe was a disciple of Taisha-ryū, an offshoot of Shinkage-ryū. He was considered a Kengō (great swordsman) and instructor to the Akizuki-han in Chikuzen Province.

The Abe ryū is known as the first major school of kenjutsu to use the term  in 1673, although the characters had also been used earlier in China. Kendō, or ken no michi, "the way of the sword", describes the teachings of his ryū which emphasized mental and moral practice rather than physical techniques.  There is no direct connection between the Abe-ryū usage of kendō and the kendo practiced today.

References 

Japanese swordsmanship
Ko-ryū bujutsu
Japanese martial arts